Baima is a town of eastern Dancheng County in eastern Henan province, China, situated near the border with Anhui and  to the east-southeast of the county seat. , it has 35 villages under its administration:
Baima Village
Zhangzhen Village
Qianzhai Village
Dasunzhuang Village
Liulou Village
Qiaokou Village
Zhangpangdian Village
Houzhai Village
Zhouli Village
Naizhong Village
Dazhou Village
Wudian Village
Hanzhuang Village
Yanzhai Village
Chentang Village
Qilou Village
Dadiao Village
Diaolou Village
Wali Village
Haoli Village
Haolao Village
Wuzhuang Village
Lizhuang Village
Xiaowanglou Village
Dawanglou Village
Huzhai Village
Gaozhuang Village
Zuozhuang Village
Lianzhuang Village
Yangzhuang Village
Chengzhuang Village
Yuge Village
Zhangzhuang Village
Lihua Village
Laoyadian Village

See also
List of township-level divisions of Henan

References

Township-level divisions of Henan
Dancheng County